Armond Lebowitz (25 September 1926 – 30 April 2015) was an American film editor. He worked in many films by Larry Cohen, such as Q - The Winged Serpent (1982) and Perfect Strangers (1984). He also edited Ladybug Ladybug (1963), Too Many Thieves (1966), The Incident (1967), and A Midsummer Night's Dream (1967).

Filmography

References

Bibliography

External links
 
 

1926 births
2015 deaths
American film editors